William Curtis was an American Negro league first baseman in the 1920s.

Curtis played for the Cleveland Browns and Indianapolis ABCs in 1924. In 27 recorded games, he posted 29 hits in 113 plate appearances.

References

External links
 and Seamheads

Year of birth missing
Year of death missing
Place of birth missing
Place of death missing
Cleveland Browns (baseball) players
Indianapolis ABCs players
Baseball first basemen